Marin Stojkić (born 30 September 1984), is a Croatian futsal player who plays for MNK Murter and the Croatia national futsal team.

References

External links
UEFA profile

1984 births
Living people
Futsal goalkeepers
Croatian men's futsal players